Thomas Hollingbery (also Hollingberry, Hollingbury) (died 1792) was an English churchman, Archdeacon of Chichester and a Fellow of the Royal Society.

He was educated at Worcester College, Oxford, where he graduated B.A. in 1755, M.A. in 1758, and D.D. in 1768. He was elected to the Royal Society in 1783.

Notes

Year of birth missing
1792 deaths
18th-century English Anglican priests
Archdeacons of Chichester
Fellows of the Royal Society